Ruth Maria Pfeiffer is a biostatistician who researches risk prediction, molecular and genetic epidemiology, and electronic medical records. She is a senior investigator in the biostatistics branch at the National Cancer Institute. Pfeiffer is an elected member of the International Statistical Institute and the American Statistical Association.

Life 
Pfeiffer received an M.S. degree in applied mathematics from the TU Wien. She earned a M.A. in applied statistics and a Ph.D. (1998) in mathematical statistics from the University of Maryland, College Park. Her dissertation was titled, Statistical problems for stochastic processes with hysteresis. Mark Freidlin was Pfeiffer's doctoral advisor. 

Pfeiffer is a tenured senior investigator in the biostatistics branch of the division of cancer epidemiology and genetics (DCEG), National Cancer Institute (NCI). Her research focuses on statistical methods for risk prediction, problems arising in molecular and genetic epidemiologic studies, and the analysis of data from electronic medical records. Pfeiffer is the recipient of a Fulbright Fellowship and an elected member of the International Statistical Institute. In 2013, she became an elected Fellow of the American Statistical Association.

Selected works

References 

Living people
Place of birth missing (living people)
Year of birth missing (living people)
TU Wien alumni
University of Maryland, College Park alumni
National Institutes of Health people
Austrian statisticians
21st-century Austrian women scientists
21st-century American women scientists
American women statisticians
21st-century American mathematicians
Biostatisticians
Cancer researchers
American medical researchers
Austrian medical researchers
Women medical researchers
Austrian emigrants to the United States
Elected Members of the International Statistical Institute
Fellows of the American Statistical Association